Ioan Sebastian Moga (born 18 December 1971) is a Romanian former football midfielder. After he ended his playing career he worked as an assistant coach.

International career
Sebastian Moga played four friendly games at international level for Romania, making his debut in a 1–0 loss against Norway at Ullevaal stadium.

Honours
Gloria Bistrița
Divizia B: 1989–90
Dinamo București
Divizia A: 1991–92

Notes

References

External links
Sebastian Moga at Magyarfutball.hu

1971 births
Living people
Romanian footballers
Romania youth international footballers
Romania under-21 international footballers
Romania international footballers
Association football midfielders
Liga I players
Liga II players
Nemzeti Bajnokság II players
ACF Gloria Bistrița players
FC Dinamo București players
FC Rapid București players
FC Universitatea Cluj players
CSM Ceahlăul Piatra Neamț players
AFC Rocar București players
Kecskeméti TE players
Orosháza FC players
Romanian expatriate footballers
Expatriate footballers in Hungary
Expatriate sportspeople in Hungary
Romanian expatriates in Hungary
Romanian expatriate sportspeople in Hungary
Sportspeople from Bistrița